WUFC may refer to:

In sport:
 Waterford United F.C.
 Watton United F.C.
 Welling United F.C.
 Western United FC
 Westbury United F.C.
 Westport United F.C.
 Whitchurch United F.C.
 Whitton United F.C.
 Winsford United F.C.
 Winslow United F.C.
 Winterbourne United F.C.
 Witney United F.C.
 Wolverhampton United F.C.
 Woodford United F.C.
 Worthing United F.C.

Other uses:
WMEX (AM), a radio station (1510 AM) licensed to serve Boston, Massachusetts, United States, which used the call sign WUFC from 2012 through 2014